Eta Sculptoris, Latinized from η Sculptoris, is a single, variable star in the central part of the southern constellation of Sculptor. It is visible to the naked eye as a faint, red-hued star with an apparent visual magnitude that fluctuates around 4.81. The star is located approximately 460 light years from the Sun based on parallax, and is drifting further away with a radial velocity of +12 km/s.

This object is an aging red giant star, currently on the asymptotic giant branch, with a stellar classification of M4III. With the supply of hydrogen at its core exhausted, the star has cooled and expanded. It now has 80 times the radius of the Sun. Eta Sculptoris is classified as a semiregular variable with a visual magnitude that fluctuates between +4.80 and +4.90, The pulsations have periods of 22.7, 23.5, 24.6, 47.3, 128.7 and 158.7 days. On average, this star is radiating over a thousand times the luminosity of the Sun from its enlarged photosphere at an effective temperature of 3,641 K.

References

M-type giants
Asymptotic-giant-branch stars
Semiregular variable stars

Sculptor (constellation)
Sculptoris, Eta
CD-33 152
002429
002210
0105